To Your Last Death is a 2019 American 2D adult animated action horror film produced and directed by Jason Axinn, and written by Jim Cirile and Tanya C. Klein. It stars the voices of Morena Baccarin, Ray Wise, Bill Moseley and William Shatner.

Plot

Sole survivor of a brutal attack that destroyed her brothers and sister, Miriam Dekalb is given a chance to re-live that night from the beginning, armed with foreknowledge of the events. Of course, there's always the chance that Miriam is insane and murdered everyone herself.

Cast

 William Shatner as The Overseer
 Morena Baccarin as Gamemaster
 Ray Wise as Cyrus DeKalb
 Bill Moseley as Pavel
 Dani Lennon as Miriam DeKalb
 Florence Hartigan as Kelsy DeKalb
 Damien Haas as Ethan DeKalb
 Ben Siemon as Colin DeKalb
 Mark Whitten as Walt, Razor Sharp

Production

Development 
Under its working title, Malevolent, the film was 114% funded on Indiegogo on March 18, 2016, with the total amount raised being $52,713. The film then entered production.

Process 
The film took five years to complete, and finished in late 2017. Post-production was completed in late 2018.

William Shatner was confirmed to have joined the cast on October 14, 2015.

Release
To Your Last Death premiered on August 23, 2019 at the London FrightFest Film Festival, and was released online via Amazon Prime Video, iTunes and VUDU in the United States on March 17, 2020. The film received a Blu-ray release on October 6, 2020.

It was screened online in the United Kingdom on May 29, 2021, as part of Grimmfest's May Madness Event.

Reception

Accolades

Future 
A sequel is in development, set in the same universe. It may be animated or live-action.

References

External links
 

2010s American animated films
American animated horror films
2019 films
American adult animated films
2010s English-language films